Måns Hedberg (born 14 December 1993) is a Swedish snowboarder who competed in the 2018 Winter Olympics. 

In March, 2017, Hedberg broke his neck while competing in Italy. During his first run of the 2018 Winter Olympics snowboard slopestyle qualifications he suffered a hard crash and was carried from the slope in a neck brace.  However, Hedberg was not injured.

References

External links
 
 
 
 
 

1993 births
Living people
Snowboarders at the 2018 Winter Olympics
Swedish male snowboarders
Olympic snowboarders of Sweden
21st-century Swedish people